Greyhound Division may refer to:

Walker's Greyhounds, a Confederate States Army division during the American Civil War
116th Panzer Division (Wehrmacht), a German Army division during World War II